Grădinița is a commune in Căușeni District, Moldova. It is composed of three villages: Grădinița, Leuntea and Valea Verde.

References

Communes of Căușeni District